Dagmar Patrasová (born 27 April 1956) is a Czech actress and singer. She is known especially for her performances in children's TV shows and roles in fairy tale films and comedies.

Personal life
Patrasová is married to musician Felix Slováček, with whom she has two children.

Selected filmography
The Little Mermaid (1976)
The Hit (1981)
Waiter, Scarper! (1981)
Choking Hazard (2004)

Television
Pan Tau (2 episodes, 1977)
Arabela (10 episodes, 1979)
Návštěvníci (15 episodes, 1983)
Arabela se vrací (22 episodes, 1993)

References

External links

1956 births
Living people
Czechoslovak film actresses
Czech film actresses
Czechoslovak women singers
Actresses from Prague
20th-century Czech actresses
21st-century Czech actresses